Bhendi yellow vein mosaic virus (BYVMV) or okra yellow vein mosaic (OYVMV) is a viral disease caused by monopartite Begomovirus affecting okra plants. It was first found in 1924 in Bombay, India, and Sri Lanka. It is the major limitation of the production of okra. This disease is transmitted by whitefly.

References

Viral plant pathogens and diseases
Begomovirus